Marc Strange (July 24, 1941 – May 20, 2012) was a Canadian television producer, singer-songwriter, writer, and actor. He and his wife, Lynn Susan, were the co-creators of CBC Television's longest running series, The Beachcombers.

Career 
Strange dropped out of high school and worked on a tobacco farm before trying acting. He appeared in the television film The Paper People. After playing some supporting roles he returned to Canada, where he and his wife were to write the first episodes of the Beachcombers, a series he was associated with, for its entire 19-year run, drafting its final episode.

Strange also wrote award-winning mystery novels. His 2010 novel Body Blows won an Edgar Award.

Jackson Davies, a long-running Beachcombers' cast-member, who went on to become a producer himself, and co-wrote a history of the show with Strange, called Strange a “Renaissance man”. Strange put his final touches on their book mere days before his death from cancer. The book was published to mark the series' 40th anniversary, and was published in 2013.

Filmography

Acting

Film

Television

Video games

Directing

Television

Writing

Television

References

External links

Canadian male voice actors
Canadian television producers
1941 births
2012 deaths